Davide Petrachi (born 14 August 1986) is an Italian former footballer who played as a goalkeeper.

Career
Petrachi grew out of the Lecce youth system, winning the scudetto in 2005 with Lecce reserve squad, as the second keeper. 

On 27 August 2014 Petrachi signed a new 1-year contract with U.S. Lecce. However, on 21 January 2015 he was released. on 11 February 2015 he was signed by Lanciano, after the injury of Nícolas. Petrachi picked no.22 shirt for his new team.

He won the "Saracinesca d'oro" award as the best youth goalkeeper.

Legal issues 
In June 2018 he has been accused of drug trade. On 6 November he reached an agreement for a plea bargain: he has been jailed for 1 year and 4 months, and he also has been fined of €1.400 .

References

External links
AIC profile (data by football.it) 

1986 births
Living people
Italian footballers
U.S. Lecce players
A.S. Sambenedettese players
A.S. Melfi players
Serie B players
Association football goalkeepers